The 2012 World Sprint Speed Skating Championships were a long track speed skating event held on 28 and 29 January 2012 in Olympic Oval, Calgary, Canada.

Men championships

Sprint results 
Stefan Groothuis skated a new points record (136.810), the previous record belonged to Jeremy Wotherspoon (137.230 [2003])

NQ = Not qualified for the second 1000m (only the best 24 are qualified)DQ = disqualified

Women championships

Sprint results 
The previous record of 149.305 set by Cindy Klassen in 2006 was beaten by Yu Jing and Christine Nesbitt, both of whom skated in the same pair for the second 1000m.

NQ = Not qualified for the second 1000m (only the best 24 are qualified)DQ = disqualified

Rules 
All participating skaters are allowed to skate the two 500 meters and one 1000 meters; 24 skaters may take part on the second 1000 meters. These 24 skaters are determined by the samalog standings after the three skated distances, and comparing these lists as follows:

 Skaters among the top 24 on both lists are qualified.
 To make up a total of 24, skaters are then added in order of their best rank on either list.

References

External links
ISU website

World Sprint Speed Skating Championships, 2012
2012 World Sprint
World Sprint, 2012
Sport in Calgary
2012 in Canadian sports